The Academy of Sciences and Arts of Bosnia and Herzegovina (Bosnian, Croatian and Serbian: Akademija nauka i umjetnosti Bosne i Hercegovine Cyrillic: Академија наука и умјетности Босне и Херцеговине) is the national academy of Bosnia and Herzegovina. The Academy, based in the capital city of Sarajevo, is the leading non-university public research institution in the country. The institution was established in 1951, during the time when the PR Bosnia and Herzegovina was a constituent part of Yugoslavia, as the Scientific Society of Bosnia and Herzegovina and upgraded into the Academy of Sciences and Arts of Bosnia and Herzegovina in 1966.

History
The Academy of Sciences and Arts of Bosnia and Herzegovina arose out of the Scientific Society, founded in 1951, by the decision of the Assembly of the People's Republic of Bosnia and Herzegovina, the highest state authority in the country, on the formation of the Scientific Society of Bosnia and Herzegovina. The Scientific Society continued to operate as the highest-level institution concerned with science until the Assembly of Bosnia and Herzegovina passed a Law on the Academy of Sciences and Arts of Bosnia and Herzegovina in 1966. Its first president between 1966 and 1968 was Vaso Butozan. The Academy of Sciences and Arts of Bosnia and Herzegovina is charged, pursuant to this Law, with responsibility for the overall development of science and the arts, with organizing scientific research and arts-related events, with publishing papers written by its members and associates, and in general with the state of science and the arts and their development in Bosnia and Herzegovina. The Academy is a wholly independent body, governed solely by the principles and interests of science and the independent convictions of its members. The Academy's Statute governs all aspects of its organization, management and operations in all the fields in which it is active.

Departments
The Academy is made up of six departments:
 Social sciences
 Medicine sciences
 Technical sciences
 Natural sciences and mathematics
 Literature
 Arts

Committees
Committees include:
 Library and documentation
 Council for international cooperation
 Publication council
 Scientific, technological and social development

Presidents
Vaso Butozan (1966–1968)
Branislav Đurđev (1968–1971)
Edhem Čamo (1971–1977)
Alojz Benac (1977–1981)
Svetozar Zimonjić (1981–1990)
Seid Huković (1990–1999)
Božidar Matić (1999–2014)
Miloš Trifković (2014–2020)
Muris Čičić (2020–present)

Honorary members
 Josip Broz Tito elected 19 November 1969
 Ivo Andrić elected 23 December 1969
 Rodoljub Čolaković elected 23 December 1969
 Edvard Kardelj elected 29 April 1971
 Vladimir Bakarić elected 18 April 1974
 Ivan Supek elected 14 May 2002
 Bogdan Bogdanović elected 14 May 2002
 Adil Zulfikarpašić elected 14 May 2002

See also
 Academy of Sciences and Arts of the Republika Srpska
 Bosniak Academy of Sciences and Arts

References

External links
 Official Website

1951 establishments in Yugoslavia
Scientific organizations established in 1951
Arts organizations established in 1951
 
Educational organizations based in Bosnia and Herzegovina
Scientific organizations based in Bosnia and Herzegovina
Arts organizations based in Bosnia and Herzegovina
Bosnia and Herzegovina
Bosnia and Herzegovina
Organizations based in Sarajevo
Education in Sarajevo
Members of the International Council for Science
Members of the International Science Council